Yengus Dese Azenaw (born 4 July 1992) is an Ethiopian female para athlete. She represented Ethiopia at the 2012 as well as in the 2016 Summer Paralympics.  SHe took part in the 100m, 200m and 400m events. Yengus Azenaw was motivated to be a professional para athlete by her primary school teacher.

References

External links 
 

1992 births
Living people
Ethiopian female sprinters
Athletes (track and field) at the 2012 Summer Paralympics
Athletes (track and field) at the 2016 Summer Paralympics